Maharanijhoda  is a village development committee in Jhapa District in the Province No. 1 of south-eastern Nepal. At the time of the 1991 Nepal census it had a population of 10,743 people living in 1811 individual households. There are mainly Brahman, Chetris living in this VDC. Manaranijhoda village development committee consists of 9 wards. The major occupation of the people of  the maharanijhoda is farming.

References

Populated places in Jhapa District